Anastassiya Bannova (born 26 February 1989) is an archer from Kazakhstan. Bannova represented Kazakhstan at the 2008 Summer Olympics. She placed 35th in the women's individual ranking round with a 72-arrow score of 628.  In the first round of elimination, she faced 30th-ranked Natalia Valeeva of Italy.  Bannova was defeated by Valeeva, losing 105–107 in the 18-arrow match, failing to advance to the round of 32. In 2012, she was nominated to participate in the women's individual competition at the 2012 Summer Olympics in London. At the London Olympics, she was ranked 54th after the qualifying round, before losing in the first elimination round to Aida Roman.

References

External links
 
 
 

1989 births
Living people
People from Oral, Kazakhstan
Archers at the 2008 Summer Olympics
Archers at the 2012 Summer Olympics
Kazakhstani female archers
Olympic archers of Kazakhstan
Kazakhstani people of Russian descent
Archers at the 2006 Asian Games
Archers at the 2010 Asian Games
Asian Games competitors for Kazakhstan
21st-century Kazakhstani women